The Vijay for Contribution to Tamil Cinema is given by STAR Vijay as part of its annual Vijay Awards ceremony for Tamil films.

The list
Here is a list of the award winners and the films for which they won.

See also
 Tamil cinema
 Cinema of India

References

Stunt Director